David Archibald Victor Clive Drummond (4 August 1890 – 8 October 1978) was a New Zealand telegraphist, signalman, radio announcer and personality. He was born in Mārahau, New Zealand, on 4 August 1890.

In 1956 he was elected to the Wellington City Council, serving one term. He did not seek re-election in 1959.

References

1890 births
1978 deaths
People from the Tasman District
New Zealand radio presenters
Wellington City Councillors
Unsuccessful candidates in the 1943 New Zealand general election